The Centro Israelita do Paraná is the main gathering place for Jews in the city of Curitiba, Brazil.

History 
The first Jew to arrive in Curitiba was José Flaks, who in 1889 arrived with his wife Roni and their children Michael and Frederick. Shortly thereafter came Max Rosenman. Both were originally from Galicia and settled in the area of Curitiba known as Barigui. The Flaks family were recognizable by their traditional Orthodox costume. Max Rosenman hosted religious services and even the manufacture of matzot for Passover. In 1913, the capital of Paraná had around 12 families and more than 20 single men. On 27 July 1913, at the initiative of Julius Stolzenberg, Bernard Schulman, Leo and Jacob Charatz Mandelman, it was decided that founded the Union Israelita do Parana, to care for cultural and religious needs of the community.

Today, the community is one of the largest of southern Brazil. It has an active Zionist youth movement in Habonim Dror and many other departments. A newsletter of community events called Oi Kehilá is produced and sent via E-mail to community members. In 2009, the community hired Argentine Rabbi Pablo Berman, formerly the rabbi of the Israeli Community of El Salvador.

Facilities

Escola Israelita Brasileira Salomão Guelmann 
Housed within the compound of the Jewish center is the Jewish school named after Salomão Guelmann who built and donated the school to the community in 1921, to serve as a foundation for the education of the Jewish children of Curitiba.

References

External links
 Centro Israelita do Paraná 
 Escola Israelita Brasileira Salomão Guelmann 
 Official blog 

Ashkenazi Jewish culture in Brazil
Ashkenazi synagogues
Conservative Judaism in Brazil
Conservative synagogues
Jewish Galician (Eastern Europe) history
Polish-Jewish diaspora
Synagogues in Brazil
Ukrainian-Jewish diaspora
Zionism in Brazil